Autoroute 13 may refer to:
 A13 autoroute, in France
 Quebec Autoroute 13, in Quebec, Canada

See also 
 List of A13 roads
 List of highways numbered 13